Sharjah University City is an education district in Sharjah, United Arab Emirates close to the Sharjah International Airport. It contains the American University of Sharjah, the Higher Colleges of Technology alongside its men and women campuses and the University of Sharjah alongside its medical and fine arts campuses. The area includes the Sharjah Police Academy, University Hospital of Sharjah, University Dental Hospital of Sharjah and the Sharjah Library.

List of universities & institutions in the University City
American University of Sharjah
Higher Colleges of Technology
Sharjah Institute of Technology
Sharjah Police Academy
Skyline University
University Hospital of Sharjah
University Dental Hospital of Sharjah
University of Sharjah
Al Qasimia University
Exeed School of Business and Finance

See also
Dubai Knowledge Village

References

 
Education in the Emirate of Sharjah
University City
Sharjah (city)